The Slave Girl is a 1977 novel by Nigerian writer Buchi Emecheta that was published in the UK by Allison and Busby and in the US by George Braziller. It won the Jock Campbell Award from the New Statesman in 1978. The novel was Emecheta's fourth book; it was dedicated to her editor Margaret Busby.

The Slave Girl was reissued in 2018 by Omenala Press.

Synopsis
The Slave Girl is set in colonial Nigeria, in the early 1900s, and tells the story of Ogbanje Ojebeta who, following the death of her parents is sold into domestic slavery. "She finds solace among her fellow slaves but learns the painful lessons of what it means to be owned by another. As she grows into a woman she longs for freedom and for a family of her own. She realizes that she must ultimately decide her own destiny, and when the opportunity arises, makes a choice that we as modern readers might find surprising."

Critical reception
Favourable reviews of the novel appeared in publications including the New Statesman – which said: "Buchi Emecheta generates a fine sympathy with human distress; this loving novel makes a telling indictment of pagan and Christian inhumanity to women" –  and the Sunday Telegraph: "Ms. Emecheta once again creates an authentic character and scene and... explains the network of customs from the past which have contributed to present attitudes." According to Juliana Ogunseiju's review for Africa Book Club: "It is one of the very best pre-colonial African books and is heartily recommended." Anita Kern in World Literature Today stated: "Ojebeta is a welcome addition to the still too small gallery of Nigerian heroines."

Awards
 1978: Jock Campbell Award from the New Statesman

Further reading
 Brodzki, Bella (1994), "Changing Masters”: Gender, Genre, and the Discourses of Slavery", in Margaret R. Higonnet (ed.), Borderwork: Feminist Engagements with Comparative Literature, Ithaca; London: Cornell University Press, pp. 42–60.
 
 Tahbildar, Barnali (1997), "The Role of the Nigerian Woman in Emecheta's The Slave Girl", Postcolonial Web.

References

External links
 Buchi Emecheta website
 Emard Brice Likibi, Marien Ngouabi-Capes, "Discourse analysis on Buchi Emecheta's The Slave Girl", Memoire online, 2008.
 Onome Onwah, "Freedom in Chains: A Review of Emecheta's 'The Slave Girl'", 10 February 2017.
 Adepeju Adenuka, "Review of The Slave Girl by Buchi Emecheta", 22 September 2017.

1977 British novels
Allison and Busby books
Igboland in fiction
Nigerian English-language novels
Novels by Buchi Emecheta 
Novels set in Nigeria
Postcolonial novels
1977 Nigerian novels